TGI may refer to:
 Technical Group of Independents (1999–2001)
 The Genome Institute
 The Ghost Inside (band), an American band formed in 2004
 TGI Friday's, a restaurant chain
 Thyroid growth immunoglobulin, found in Graves' disease
 Tribunal de grande instance de Paris
 Triumph Group's NYSE ticker symbol
 Target Group Index, a subsidiary of market research company Kantar Group